Events from the year 1933 in Denmark.

Incumbents
 Monarch – Christian X
 Prime minister – Thorvald Stauning

Events

Sports
 22 April ASA Fodbold is founded.
 4 May  Kastrup Boldklub is founded.

Date unknown
 Frem wins their fourth Danish football championship by winning the 1932–33 Danish Championship League.

Births
 1 August – Ebbe Langberg, actor (died 1989)
 17 August – Bonna Søndberg, Operatic soprano

Deaths
 10 September – L. A. Ring, painter (born 1854)
 30 October – Svend Kornbeck, stage and film actor (born 1869)
 14 November – Poul Simon Christiansen, painter and church decorator (born 1855)
 22 November – Christian Bayer, illustrator (born 1841)
 11 December – Michael Agerskov, spiritualist teacher and author (born 1870)
 13 December – Carl Johan Bonnesen, sculptor (born 1868)
 21 December – Knud Rasmussen, arctic explorer, anthropologist (born 1879)

References

 
Denmark
Years of the 20th century in Denmark
1930s in Denmark
1933 in Europe